Amri–Nal culture is attributed to Amri archaeological sites in Sindh and Balochistan provinces of Pakistan. It flourished in the 4th and 3rd millennia BC. The dual typesites are Amri and Nal.

Location

Several settlements attributed to the Amri culture have been discovered, mainly in lower Sindh. They are often distributed along the terraces of old and active river courses and consist of sites of different size and shape, which are sometimes stratified below settlements of later periods. Among these, that of the Tharro Hills, near the town of Gujo, is one of the most famous of lower Sindh.

Cultural context 

The earliest site of this culture is Kunal (4000 BCE) in Haryana which is older than Rehman Dheri (3300 BCE). The type site, the first excavated site of this type of culture is Kot Diji. Rehman Dheri, which was considered oldest example of this culture, is now the second oldest example of this culture after Kunal was excavated and found to be older than Rehman Dher with similar older cultural artifacts then the Rehman Dheri.

Kot Diji and Amri are close to each other in Sindh, they earlier developed indigenous culture which had common elements, later they came in contact with Harappan culture and fully developed into Harappan culture. Earliest examples of artifacts belonging to this culture were found at Rehman Dheri, however, later excavations found the oldest example of this culture at Kunal. These are cultural ancestor to site at Harappa. These sites have pre-Harappan indigenous cultural levels, distinct from the culture of Harappa, these are at Banawali (level I), Kot Diji (level 3A), Amri (level II). Rehman Dheri also has a pre Kot Diji phase (RHD1 3300-28 BCE) which are not part of IVC culture. Kot Diji has two later phases that continue into and alongside Mature Harappan Phase (RHDII and RHDII 2500-2100 BCE). Fortified towns found here are dated as follows.

 Kunal (5000/4000 BCE- ), in Hisar district of Haryana in India is the earliest site found with layers in phase I dating back to 5000 BCE and 4000 BCE, site's culture is an older ancestry of the Pre-Harappan site of Rehman Dheri which was dated to  3300 BC. A button seal was discovered at Kunal during 1998-99 excavations by Archaeological Survey of India. The seal is similar to the Rehman Dheri examples. It contained a picture of two deer on one side, and geometrical pattern on other side. The second phase of Kunal corresponds to  post-neolithic phase of Hakra culture' (also called Early Harappan Phase, c.3300-2800 BCE or c.5000-2800 BCE) was also found.
 Kot Diji (3300 BCE), is the type site, located in Sindh in Pakistan.
 Amri (3600–3300 BCE), also has non-Harappan phases daring 6000 BC to 4000 BC, and later Harappan Phses till 1300 BCE.
 Kalibangan (3500 BC – 2500 BC), in northwest Rajasthan in India on Ghaggar River.
 Rehman Dheri, 3300 BCE, near Dera Ismail Khan and close to River Zhob Valleyin Khyber Pakhtunkhwa in Pakistan.

 Amri-Nal cultural arfictasAmri-Nal culture'': Based on the pottery found here, it is classified as a separate archaeological culture / subculture.

The Amri culture is a characteristic Chalcolithic cultural aspect of Lower Sindh. It does not exist in Balochistan and also in the Las Bela province where, in contrast, are known many sites of the Nal culture. Unfortunately both these two cultural aspects are very insufficiently radiocarbon dated, though we suggest that they flourished around the middle of the fourth millennium cal BC. Amri is a stratified mound located in Upper Sindh, alonb the right (western) bankof the Indus. The Amri sequence is quite thick here, so we can suggest that the site was settled  for a few centuries.

The Amri culture fine ware is light buff with linear geometric motifs painted in dark brown and black, while the coarse one, though not so coarse at all, is slipped in red (see Casal 1964). The knapped stone assemblage is also very typical and does not find paralleles in that of the following early Bronze Age Kot Diji aspect. It is characterised by a blade assemblage, with implements detached by pressute flaking, with semi-abrupt retouch. The most typical tool is atriangle retouched along  three sides, otherwise called "Amri Triangle" (see Biagi 2005). There are many sites of this cultural aspect in Sindh. The late Professor A.R. Khan discovered many, that are systematically wethered and very often fortified, like the Tharro Hills or Kot Raja Manjera (see Khan 1979)

See also

 Indus Valley civilization
 List of Indus Valley civilization sites
 Bhirrana, 4 phases of IVC with earliest dated to 8th-7th millennium BCE
 Harappa
 Kalibanga, an IVC town and fort with several phases starting from Early harappan phase
 Kunal, Haryana pre harappan cultural ancestor of Rehman Dheri
 Mohenjo Daro
 Rakhigarhi, one of the largest IVC city with 4 phases of IVC with earliest dated to 8th-7th millennium BCE
 List of inventions and discoveries of the Indus Valley civilization
 Hydraulic engineering of the Indus Valley civilization
 Sanitation of the Indus Valley civilisation
 Periodisation of the Indus Valley civilisation
 Pottery in the Indian subcontinent

References
 Casal J.-M. 1964 - Fouilles d'Amri. Klincksieck, Paris (2 volumes)
 Biagi P.  - The chipped stone assemblage of the Tharro Hills (Thatta, Sindh, Pakistan): a preliminary typological analysis. Rivista di Scienze Preistoriche, Supplemento 1: 553-566. Florence
 Khan A. R. 1979 - Studies in Geomorphology and Prehistory of Sind. Grassroots III (2), Special Issue. Jamshoro, University of Sind, Pakistan Studies Centre.

Archaeological sites in Pakistan
Indus Valley civilisation sites
Former populated places in Pakistan
Amri-Nal culture